Woodley Airways was a carrier based in Anchorage, Alaska, United States. The airline was founded in 1932 by Art Woodley (died 30 May 1990, aged 84).

Woodley Airways operated a flight from Anchorage to Nome. It was a one plane one pilot operation. It quickly caught on as an alternative to a dogsled trip. Woodley charged customers 150 dollars; the sled trip took 750 dollars. In 1943 Woodley Airways tried to change their name to Alaska Airlines as that name went to Star Air Service. In 1945 Woodley Airways changed its name to Pacific Northern Airlines.

See also 
 List of defunct airlines of the United States

References      

Airlines based in Alaska
1932 establishments in Alaska
Airlines established in 1932
Defunct airlines of the United States
Airlines disestablished in 1945
1945 disestablishments in Alaska